Kalnibolotskaya is a rural locality (a stanitsa) in Novopokrovsky District of Krasnodar Krai, Russia, located on the Yeya River. Population:

References

Rural localities in Krasnodar Krai
Novopokrovsky District
Kuban Oblast